Francis Wilcox Treadway (January 7, 1869 – December 24, 1925) was an American politician who served as the 30th lieutenant governor of Ohio from 1909 to 1911.

Biography

Francis W. Treadway was born in New Haven, Connecticut in 1869, and was moved to Cleveland, Ohio when ten years of age. He was educated at Cleveland grammar and high schools. He graduated with BS from Worcester Polytechnic Institute in 1890, and Yale Law School in 1892. In 1893, he and William H. Marlatt formed the law firm of Treadway and Marlatt.  He married Esther Sutliff Frisbie on January 5, 1897, and they had two children. He wrote Ohio Mechanics Lien Law, 1901. He was United States Commissioner for Northern District of Ohio, 1902–1903.

Career
Treadway was elected to represent Cuyahoga County in the Ohio House of Representatives in 1903 for the 76th General Assembly, (1904–1905), as a Republican. In 1908 Treadway was elected lieutenant governor.

References

1869 births
1925 deaths
Lieutenant Governors of Ohio
Republican Party members of the Ohio House of Representatives
Politicians from Cleveland
Politicians from New Haven, Connecticut
Worcester Polytechnic Institute alumni
Ohio lawyers
Yale Law School alumni
Lawyers from Cleveland
Lawyers from New Haven, Connecticut
19th-century American lawyers